José Sanfrancisco Orero, born on 9 April 1944 (Valencia) Spain is a Spanish painter, sculptor, poet and writer belonging to the expressionism movement. In 1950 his family moves to Mendoza, Argentina, where in 1958 he is enrolled at the age of 13 into the Academia Provincial de Bellas Artes y Escuela de Artes Aplicadas a la Aquitecture e Ingeniería. One of his better known works is Música Salvaje (1964), for which he wins the Gran Premio de Pintura de Salón Nacional de San Luís (Argentina) in 1965. In 1967 he writes Antes del mármol a small collection of poems published in Argentina and available today in some of the most notable public and university research libraries, including amongst others the New York Public Library, Stanford University Library and Yale University Library.

References

20th-century Spanish painters
20th-century Spanish male artists
Spanish male painters
1944 births
Spanish sculptors
Spanish male sculptors
Spanish poets
Living people